The Schuffenecker Family or Schuffenecker's Studio is an 1889 oil on canvas painting by Paul Gauguin, now in the Musée d'Orsay. It shows the artist's painter friend Émile Schuffenecker with his wife Louise Lançon and their two children Jeanne (born 1882) and Paul (born 1884). On the wall to the right of the window is a still-life with fruits and a Japanese print, reflecting the then-fashionable Japonism.

References

1889 paintings
Paintings in the collection of the Musée d'Orsay
Group portraits by French artists
Paintings by Paul Gauguin
19th-century portraits
Paintings of children